Aransas is a placename for several neighboring places in coastal Southern Texas.
Aransas County, Texas
The Aransas River, which begins in Bee County, Texas, and flows into Copano Bay in Aransas County
The Aransas Bay, fed by Copano Bay
Aransas Pass, Texas, which borders the Aransas Bay
Port Aransas, Texas
The Aransas Pass, a navigable salt water channel connecting the Gulf of Mexico with Aransas Bay
The Aransas National Wildlife Refuge, north of Aransas River
The ghost town of Aransas City

Geography of Texas